The C&C 37 is a Canadian sailboat, that was designed by Robert W. Ball of C&C Design and first built in 1981.

Production
The boat was built by C&C Yachts in Canada between 1981 and 1986, but it is now out of production.

Design
The C&C 37 is a small recreational keelboat, built predominantly of fiberglass, with wood trim. It has a masthead sloop rig, an internally-mounted spade-type rudder. It displaces  and carries  of  lead ballast.

A centreboard version was also built.

The standard keel version has a PHRF racing average handicap of 69. The shoal draft keel version has a PHRF racing average handicap of 108 with a high of 108 and low of 111. The centreboard version has a PHRF racing average handicap of 114 with a high of 114 and low of 120.

See also
List of sailing boat types

Similar sailboats
Alberg 37
Baltic 37
C&C 110
CS 36
Dickerson 37
Dockrell 37
Endeavour 37
Express 37
Hunter 36-2
Marlow-Hunter 37
Nor'Sea 37
Tayana 37

References

External links
 Original Factory Brochure - C&C 37, 4 page, colour
 Original Factory Brochure - C&C 37, 6 page, colour

Keelboats
1980s sailboat type designs
Sailing yachts
Sailboat type designs by Robert W. Ball
Sailboat types built by C&C Yachts